= Adu Garhi =

Adu Garhi ادو گڑھی
- Location within Pakistan
- Coordinates: 33.60°N 70.93°E
- Country: Pakistan
- Territory: Federally Administered Tribal Areas
- Elevation: 1,175 m (3,855 ft)
- Time zone: UTC+5 (PST)
  - Summer (DST): UTC+6 (PDT)

Adu Garhi (Urdu: ادو گڑھی) is a town in the Federally Administered Tribal Areas of Pakistan. It is located at 33°36'18N 70°55'42E with an altitude of 1175 metres (3858 feet).
